John Lawrence May (March 31, 1922 – March 24, 1994) was an American clergyman of the Roman Catholic Church. He served as Bishop of Mobile (1969–1980) and Archbishop of St. Louis (1980–1992).

Early life and education
John May was born in Evanston, Illinois, to Peter Michael and Catherine (née Allare) May. He received his early education at the parochial school of St. Nicholas Church in his native city, and attended Archbishop Quigley Preparatory Seminary in Chicago, from where he graduated in 1940. His theological studies were made at St. Mary of Lake Seminary in Mundelein. where he earned a Licentiate of Sacred Theology. May was of Luxembourgian ancestry.

Priesthood
On May 3, 1947, May was ordained to the priesthood by Cardinal Samuel Stritch. His first assignment was as a curate at St. Gregory Church in Chicago, where he remained until he became chaplain of Mercy Hospital in 1956. From 1959 to 1967 he served as vice-president and general secretary of the Catholic Church Extension Society, becoming president in 1967. He also taught at St. Gregory the Great High School and Loyola University, and served on the archdiocesan marriage tribunal.

Episcopacy

Chicago
On June 16, 1967, May was appointed Auxiliary Bishop of Chicago and Titular Bishop of Tagarbala by Pope Paul VI. He received his episcopal consecration on the following August 24 from Cardinal John Cody, with Bishops Cletus F. O'Donnell and Aloysius John Wycislo serving as co-consecrators, at Holy Name Cathedral. In addition to his episcopal duties, he served as pastor of Christ the King Church in Chicago.

Mobile
Following the resignation of Bishop Thomas Joseph Toolen, May was appointed the seventh Bishop of Mobile, Alabama, on September 29, 1969. His installation took place on the following December 10 at the Cathedral of the Immaculate Conception. During his 10-year-long tenure in Mobile, he established eight parishes and two deaneries, dedicated twelve churches, founded two schools, and erected a convent. He also dedicated several other institutions, including parish centers, elderly homes, and a new wing and intensive-care unit at Providence Hospital.

May continued to implement the liturgical reforms of the Second Vatican Council, authorizing the laity to distribute Communion, the reception of Communion in the hand, and a new rite for the Sacrament of Penance. He founded an Office of Youth Ministry, Diocesan Pastoral Council, and Diocesan Board of Catholic Education. He also established a retirement program for all lay church employees, a new health insurance program, a marriage preparation program, and anti-abortion programs. In 1977, he imposed a term limit of six years for parish priests in the diocese. He ordained the diocese's first class of permanent deacons in 1979.

St. Louis
On January 24, 1980, May was appointed the sixth Archbishop of St. Louis, Missouri, by Pope John Paul II. He was installed at the Cathedral Basilica of St. Louis on March 25, 1980. During his 12-year-long tenure, he proved to be very committed to ecumenism and racial harmony. He encouraged an active dialogue between Christians of all denominations, and ordained J. Terry Steib as St. Louis' first African American auxiliary bishop. He also appointed the archdiocese's first chief financial officer and the first woman to serve as superintendent of Catholic schools. As he had done in Mobile, he started a self-insurance program in the archdiocese and improved the retirement program for lay employees.

An advocate for the poor and homeless, he greatly expanded the programs of Catholic Charities, and initiated a pro-life program designed to directly assist women with crisis pregnancies. He served as President of the National Conference of Catholic Bishops from 1986 to 1989; in this position, he served as spokesman for the Catholic Church in the United States. Due to a decline in the number of seminarians, May was forced to consolidate the archdiocesan seminary system. In 1987, he merged Cardinal Glennon College and Kenrick Seminary to form Kenrick-Glennon Seminary. In 1990, with Sister Mary Ann Eckhoff and St. Louis businessman Robert A. Brooks, he co-founded the Archdiocese's "Today and Tomorrow Educational Foundation".

Later life and death
In July 1992, May was diagnosed with brain cancer. For this reason, he resigned as Archbishop on December 9 of that year. He died over a year later at a St. Louis nursing home, aged 71. He was buried in the Cathedral Basilica of St. Louis.

References

1922 births
1994 deaths
20th-century Roman Catholic archbishops in the United States
Roman Catholic archbishops of St. Louis
Burials at the Cathedral Basilica of Saint Louis (St. Louis)
People from Evanston, Illinois
Clergy from St. Louis
Roman Catholic bishops of Mobile
University of Saint Mary of the Lake alumni
Deaths from brain cancer in the United States
Catholics from Illinois